Sunwoo Eun-sook (born December 24, 1959) is a South Korean actress. Sunwoo made her acting debut in 1978, and rose to fame in the 1980s.

Personal life 
Sunwoo married actor Lee Young-ha in 1981 when they were both at the peak of their careers; they divorced in 2007 after 26 years of marriage. Sunwoo and Lee have two sons, one of whom is also an actor, Lee Sang-won. 

On October 11, 2022, Sunwoo's agency stated that Sunwoo registered her marriage with announcer Yoo Young-jae.

Filmography

Television series

Film

Awards and nominations

References

External links 
 Sunwoo Eun-sook at Management Koo 
 
 
 
 

1959 births
Living people
20th-century South Korean actresses
21st-century South Korean actresses
South Korean television actresses
South Korean film actresses
Seoul Institute of the Arts alumni
Actresses from Seoul
Seonu clan of Taiyuan
Best New Actress Paeksang Arts Award (television) winners